Holy Family Hospital, Rawalpindi is a largest healthcare hospital in Rawalpindi, Pakistan. It is the 864-bed hospital and has 12 operational departments.

The hospital is affiliated with Rawalpindi Medical University.

History
The Christian Mission of Philadelphia started the hospital in 1927 in an old structure near Liaquat Bagh on Murree Road, and it moved to its current location in Satellite Town in 1946.

In 1945, following World War II, an Italian architect and war prisoner created the Holy Family Hospital (HFH) for Christian missionaries to serve the local people. The hospital was reestablished in 1948 after the partition of India. Initially, it was housed in St Mary's Cambridge Higher Secondary School building.

In 1977, Government of Punjab, Pakistan was given control of the hospital.

References

Hospitals in Rawalpindi
1948 establishments in Pakistan
Hospitals established in 1948
Christian hospitals